Kivijärvi ("Rock Lake") is a common name of lakes in Finland and may refer to:
Kivijärvi, a municipality in the Central Finland region
Lake Kivijärvi (Central Finland), a lake in Central Finland
Lake Kivijärvi, a lake in South Karelia, Finland
Kivijärvi (surname)